The Kaikōura Ranges are two parallel ranges of mountains located in the northeast of the South Island of New Zealand.  The two ranges are visible from a great distance, including from the southern coast of the North Island.

Description 
Formed along New Zealand's Marlborough Fault System, they can be seen as the northernmost extension of the Southern Alps / Kā Tiritiri o te Moana in the South Island.  Named the Looker-on mountains, by Captain James Cook, they take their name from the town of Kaikōura at the southern extreme of the more eastern range, the Seaward Kaikōuras. This range rises straight from (and dominates) the coast to the north of the town, and reaches its highest point with the  Mount Manakau.

The long straight river valley of the Waiau Toa / Clarence River separate the Seaward Kaikōuras from the longer and loftier Inland Kaikōuras. This latter range contains the highest peak in the ranges, the  Tapuae-o-Uenuku, the translation from the Māori of which is the poetic "Footprint of the rainbow". Beyond the Inland Kaikōuras is the valley of the Awatere River, which runs parallel to that of the Waiau Toa / Clarence. The climate is characterised by a dry cold winter.

Demographics

Kaikōura Ranges had a population of 1,689 at the 2018 New Zealand census, an increase of 144 people (9.3%) since the 2013 census, and an increase of 270 people (19.0%) since the 2006 census. There were 585 households. There were 894 males and 795 females, giving a sex ratio of 1.12 males per female. The median age was 44.6 years (compared with 37.4 years nationally), with 315 people (18.7%) aged under 15 years, 246 (14.6%) aged 15 to 29, 870 (51.5%) aged 30 to 64, and 261 (15.5%) aged 65 or older.

Ethnicities were 89.5% European/Pākehā, 17.1% Māori, 0.7% Pacific peoples, 3.0% Asian, and 2.3% other ethnicities (totals add to more than 100% since people could identify with multiple ethnicities).

The proportion of people born overseas was 12.4%, compared with 27.1% nationally.

Although some people objected to giving their religion, 51.3% had no religion, 36.6% were Christian, 0.4% were Hindu, 0.9% were Muslim, 0.5% were Buddhist and 2.5% had other religions.

Of those at least 15 years old, 186 (13.5%) people had a bachelor or higher degree, and 291 (21.2%) people had no formal qualifications. The median income was $35,600, compared with $31,800 nationally. The employment status of those at least 15 was that 834 (60.7%) people were employed full-time, 246 (17.9%) were part-time, and 15 (1.1%) were unemployed.

Flora 
These mountains are characterised by tussock land, fellfields, and large areas of open scree, while lowland forests have largely been cleared. The Spencer range to the south meanwhile has a more intact beech forest covering.

Fauna 
The ranges contain the Kowhai Valley and Shearwater Stream Important Bird Area.

References 

Landforms of the Marlborough Region
Kaikōura District
Mountain ranges of New Zealand